Segawa (written:  or ) is a Japanese surname. Notable people with the surname include:

, Japanese ice hockey player
, Japanese enka singer
, Japanese footballer
, Japanese field hockey player
, Japanese footballer
, Japanese actor
, Japanese boxer
, Japanese shogi player
, Japanese kickboxer
, Japanese illustrator
, Japanese boxer
, Japanese footballer

Hawaiian Royalty 
Sir Cody Segawa  (born 1997), Kapili Estimation Manager, SumoQuote Yokozuna, Dabbled in vape tricks, and saving his allowance for a super car. First raised to nobility when he sent 19 SumoQuotes out in one day. But Reclaimed his title as he once drank 7 Modelo's in 10 hours and wasn't even sick. Notably 5'6.5" no cap

Other People 
Lawrence Segawa (born 1984), Ugandan footballer
Nakisanze Segawa, Ugandan poet and writer

Japanese-language surnames